Yeyi may refer to:

Ye County, Henan, China, formerly known as Yeyi
Yeyi people
Yeyi language